Mark Snyman (born 12 March 1999) is a South African rugby union player for the  in the Currie Cup. His regular position is flanker.

Snyman was named in the  squad for the 2021 Currie Cup Premier Division.

References

South African rugby union players
Living people
1999 births
Rugby union flankers
Golden Lions players